The 1994 Gael Linn Cup, the most important representative competition for elite level participants in the women's team field sport of camogie, was won by Munster, who defeated Ulster in the final, played at Silver Park Kilmacud. For the second year of a two-year experimental period, the Gael Linn Cups were played with teams of 15-a-side, as a prelude to the increase in team size from 12 to 15 in 1999 for all matches.

Arrangements
Ulster had a surprise 2–10 to 1–12 win over Leinster at Navan. Munster had a walkover from Connacht then defeated an Ulster team which, for the first time, had no Antrim players 4–11 to 2–7 in the final at Silver Park.
Ulster defeated Leinster 4–8 to 2–8, in the Gael Linn trophy semi-final at Navan. Munster had to come from behind to defeat an all-Roscommon Connacht 1–11 to 2–4. Pauline McCarthy scored three goals as Munster defeated Ulster 5–9 to 2–12 in the final.

Final stages

|}

Junior Final

|}
 
|}

References

External links
 Camogie Association

1994 in camogie
1994
Cam